iText is a library for creating and manipulating PDF files in Java and.NET.

iText was written by Bruno Lowagie. The source code was initially distributed as open source under the Mozilla Public License or the GNU Library General Public License open source licenses. However, as of version 5.0.0 (released Dec 7, 2009) it is distributed under the Affero General Public License version 3. A fork of the LGPL/MPL licensed version of iText is currently being actively maintained as the OpenPDF library on GitHub. iText is also available through a proprietary license, distributed by iText Software NV.

iText provides support for advanced PDF features such as PKI-based signatures, 40-bit and 128-bit encryption, colour correction, Tagged PDF, PDF forms (AcroForms), PDF/X, colour management via ICC profiles, and barcodes, and is used by several products and services, including Eclipse BIRT, Jasper Reports, JBoss Seam, Windward Reports, and pdftk.

History
iText (formerly rugPdf) was developed by Bruno Lowagie in the winter of 1998 as an in-house project at Ghent University to create a PDF document application for the student administration. Preliminary versions lacked most modern functionality, initially only featuring the ability to read and write PDF files, and required developers to be knowledgeable of PDF syntax, objects, operators, and operands to work with the library. Leonard Rosenthol, PDF Architect at Adobe, lists iText as one of the early milestones in the history of the openness of PDF.

In 1999, Lowagie disbanded the rugPdf code and wrote the new library named iText. Lowagie created iText as a library that Java developers could use to create PDF documents without knowing PDF syntax and released it as a Free and Open Source Software (FOSS) product on February 14, 2000. In the summer of 2000, Paulo Soares joined the project and is now considered one of the main developers.

In late 2008, iText became available for proprietary license, and in early 2009, iText Software Corp. was formed to be the worldwide licensor of iText products.

NET Framework under the name iTextSharp, written in C#. While it has a separate codebase, it is synchronised to the main iText release schedule.

In 2020, iText celebrated 20 years of iText code with the release of iText 7.1.10.

ISO standards support
iText adheres to most modern day PDF standards, including:

 ISO 32000-1 (PDF 1.7)
 ISO 19005 (PDF/A)
 ISO 14289 (PDF/UA)

Licensing
iText was originally released under the MPL/LGPL. On December 1, 2009, with the release of iText 5, the license was switched to the Affero General Public License v3. Projects that did not want to provide their source code (as required by the AGPL) could either purchase a commercial license to iText 5 or continue using previous versions of iText under the MPL/LGPL.

iText Group NV claims that during the due diligence process to prepare for iText 5, several IP issues with iText 2 were discovered and fixed.

Forks 
 OpenPDF is an active open source project released under LGPL and MPL, that is based on a fork of iText.

Awards
In 2007, SOA World Magazine listed iText as one of the ten Open Source solutions enterprises should be using. James Gosling praised the iText library, using it in a new edition of Huckster. The New York Times also used iText to create PDF versions of their public domain articles.

In 2011, iText was featured at Devoxx (The Java community conference).

In 2013, Deloitte nominated the iText Software Group for the Technology Fast 50 Award in the Benelux. The company was ranked 10th in the Benelux and Third in Belgium.

In 2014, iText won the BelCham Entrepreneurship Award in the category "Most Promising Company of the Year" and Deloitte recognized iText Group NV as the fastest growing technology company in Belgium. Subsequently, the company was ranked #28 in Deloitte's Technology Fast 500 in the EMEA region. iText was also featured on the PDF Days in Cologne, Washington DC in New York, on Java One in San Francisco, on Devoxx in Antwerp, and many other events.

In 2017, iText won the international Business Awards - "Most Innovative Tech Company of the Year - under 100 employees 2017" iText is proud to be honored with a second Silver Stevie in the International Business Awards. This year we are recognized as the "Most Innovative Tech Company of the Year—under 100 employees".

In 2017 IT person of the Year — 2017 For the second year in a row, our Founder, Bruno Lowagie, was selected as one of the nominees on the Long List of the Belgian IT Person of the Year Award by Computable

In 2017, the American Business Awards For the third time in a row, iText has won a Bronze Stevie in the American Business Awards in the category "Most Innovative Tech Company of the Year."

In 2017/18, the ITEXT GROUP won "The ELITE Award for Growth Strategy of the Year".

In 2018 - Inc. 5000 Europe Award 2018 For the 4th year in a row, iText made the Inc. 5000 Europe list, which is made up of the fastest growing private companies in Europe.

In 2019, iText won a Silver Stevie in the American Business Awards for "Most Innovative Tech Company of the Year - under 100 employees". In addition to the ABA win, iText was a National Winner of "Growth Strategy of the Year" at the European Business Awards.

See also

List of PDF software

References

Further reading

Review first edition on JavaLobby  by Stephen Kitt
Review second edition in Freies Magazin by Michael Niedermai
Tools of the Trade, Part 1: Creating PDF documents with iText by Jeff Friesen (Adobe Press)

External links

Free PDF software
Free typesetting software
Free software programmed in C Sharp
Free software programmed in Java (programming language)
Java platform
Java (programming language) libraries
C Sharp libraries
Software using the GNU AGPL license